Peter Bjornson is a politician in Manitoba, Canada. He was a cabinet minister in the NDP government of  Premier Greg Selinger.

Bjornson has lived for his entire life in the community of Gimli, Manitoba. He worked as a teacher before entering politics, and has extensive experience in local community service. Bjornson received a Governor General's Award for excellence in teaching Canadian history in 2000, and a Prime Minister's Medal in 2001. He also served as a town councillor in Gimli between 1988 and 2002.

Bjornson was one of the new MLAs in the New Democratic Party caucus following the party's provincial election victory in 2003. He was elected in the riding of Gimli, which had been won by the Progressive Conservatives in the election of 1999. With the incumbent MLA retiring, Bjornson defeated Tory candidate by 5500 votes to 3651.

After the election, Bjornson was appointed as Manitoba's Minister of Education, Citizenship and Youth. In November 2009, he became Minister of Entrepreneurship, Training and Trade under Premier Selinger.

He was re-elected in the 2007 and 2011 provincial elections.

References

Canadian people of Icelandic descent
New Democratic Party of Manitoba MLAs
Living people
Year of birth missing (living people)
People from Gimli, Manitoba
Members of the Executive Council of Manitoba
21st-century Canadian politicians